Andries Thomas Van Buskirk House, is located in Saddle River, Bergen County, New Jersey. The house was built in 1725 and was added to the National Register of Historic Places on January 10, 1983.

See also
National Register of Historic Places listings in Bergen County, New Jersey

References

External links

Houses on the National Register of Historic Places in New Jersey
Houses completed in 1725
Houses in Bergen County, New Jersey
Saddle River, New Jersey
National Register of Historic Places in Bergen County, New Jersey
1725 establishments in New Jersey
New Jersey Register of Historic Places